Maike van der Duin (born 12 September 2001) is a Dutch professional racing cyclist, who currently rides for UCI Women's Continental Team  and represents the Netherlands on the track.

Major results

2018
 9th Overall Healthy Ageing Tour Juniors
2019
 1st Stage 3 EPZ Omloop van Borsele
 National Junior Road Championships
4th Road race
9th Time trial
 7th Overall Healthy Ageing Tour Juniors
2020
European Track Championships - u23
2nd  Scratch race
2021
1st Omloop der Kempen
7th Overall Kreiz Breizh Elites Dames
European Track Championships - u23
1st  Scratch race
2nd  Madison (with Marit Raaijmakers)
2nd  Omnium 
3rd  Elimination race
2022
 5th Drentse Acht van Westerveld
 Tour de France
Held  after Stages 1–2
 Stage 2 Tour de France

References

External links
 

2001 births
Living people
Dutch female cyclists
Place of birth missing (living people)
Dutch cyclists at the UCI Track Cycling World Championships
People from Assen
Cyclists from Drenthe
21st-century Dutch women